Catherine Spencer (born 25 May 1979) is a former English female rugby union player. She was selected as captain in 2007. She captained  at the 2010 Women's Rugby World Cup and was also a member of the squad to the 2006 World Cup.

Spencer retired from international rugby in 2011. Spencer scored 18 tries for England, played in 8 six nations 04, 05, 06, 07, 08, 09, 10, 11 won 6 as well as 5 grand slams. Her awards have included England Player of the Year in 2006, the Rugby Union Writers Club Award in 2010, and the Linda Uttley Award in 2011.

Spencer played for Worcester, Bristol and Aylesford Bulls Ladies and has now completely retired from playing rugby.

Spencer ran her own successful women's speaker agency Inspiring women until the global pandemic put a stop to in person speaking events. Because of the pandemic, she made the decision to become a teacher and now teaches at a school not far from where she grew up.

Spencer was awarded an honorary doctorate from Canterbury Christ Church University in September 2018 for significantly raising the profile of women's rugby through her leadership and continuing to inspire girls and women.

In 2022, Spencer commentated on matches for ITV for the 2021 Rugby World Cup.

References

https://www.canterbury.ac.uk/news-centre/press-releases/2018/figures-from-sport-local-government-policing-and-medicine-receive-honorary-awards.aspx#.W5DrKegqNMI.linkedin#i
http://www.cantrugby.co.uk/news/england-star-spencer-joins-canterbury?comp=127&comp_dir=next 

1979 births
Living people
England women's international rugby union players
English female rugby union players
Female rugby union players
Rugby union players from Ashford, Kent